Leucauge argenteanigra is an endemic long-jawed orb weaving spider species of the family Tetragnathidae that lives on São Tomé Island. It was first described in 1884 by Ferdinand Karsch as Meta argenteanigra.

References

Further reading
Karsch, 1884 : Arachnoidea. Die Fauna der Guinea-Inseln S.-Thomé und Rolas. Sitzungsberichte der Gesellschaft zur Beförderung der Gesamten Naturwissenschaften zu Marburg, vol. 2, p. 60-68.

Spiders described in 1884
Endemic fauna of São Tomé Island
Tetragnathidae
Spiders of Africa